Philiris lavendula is a species of butterfly of the family Lycaenidae. It is found in West Irian (Wandesi).

The length of the forewings is about 20 mm. The ground colour of the forewings is matt purple with a white underside.

References

Butterflies described in 1963
Luciini